The Indonesian Solidarity Party (abbreviated PSI) is a political party in Indonesia that focuses on women's rights, pluralism, and Indonesian youth. It is led by Giring Ganesha.

PSI endorsed incumbent President Joko Widodo for the 2019 election. On the evening of the 2019 general election, party leader Grace Natalie acknowledged that 'quick count' results indicated PSI had won only about 2% of the national vote and would therefore not be represented in the national parliament.

Background
Party leaders encourage Indonesian youths to engage in politics through local elections and Independence Day celebrations. The party uses Facebook and Twitter for campaigns and uses hashtags such as #Merdeka100Persen (100 percent independent) on Independence Day and #KepoinPilkada (Get to know about local elections) for local elections.

PSI's platform is solidarity and pluralism. The party claims that most of its members are youths. PSI sets strict criteria for its leaders, namely that they cannot have been in leadership positions in other parties previously and that the maximum age to hold a leadership position in PSI is 45, while most of its members are around 20–30 years old.

The General Elections Commission in February 2018 announced that PSI was eligible to contest the 2019 general election.

Ideology and positions 
The PSI is social democratic. Some of its policies are to:
 Ban polygamy practiced by public officials if elected into the parliament. 
 Oppose local regulations based on religion.

Legislatures 
The party is currently represented only in regional legislatures ("Dewan Perwakilan Rakyat Daerah"/DPRD) and not in the national People's Representative Council. It currently seats representatives in the several provincial legislatures such as Jakarta and Bali, in addition to the municipal legislatures of a number of relatively large cities such as Surabaya and Bandung.

Joining of Berkarya Party Elements 
Elements from Berkarya Party led by the former general secretary of Berkarya Party, Badaruddin Andi Picunang joined the party on 1 March 2023 after the failure of Berkarya Party to contest in 2024 Indonesian general election and prolonged internal conflicts inside the party. The joining of the Berkarya Party is unique and somewhat ironic, as Berkarya is running on the Soehartoism and New Order Revivalism platform, which opposed to the much progressive PSI and their historical intense rivalry of both party back in 2018.

Chairperson

Election results

Legislative election results

Presidential election results

Note: Bold text suggests the party's member

References

Political parties in Indonesia
Political parties established in 2016
Feminist parties in Asia
Feminist organizations in Indonesia
Left-wing populism
Liberal parties in Indonesia
Progressive parties
Pancasila political parties
Social democratic parties in Asia
2016 establishments in Indonesia